Highly Available Storage (HAST) is a protocol and tool set for FreeBSD written by Pawel Jakub Dawidek, a core FreeBSD developer.

HAST provides a block device to be synchronized between two servers for use as a filesystem.  The two machines comprise a cluster, where each machine is a cluster node.  HAST uses a Primary-Secondary (or Master-Slave) configuration, so only one cluster node is active at a time.

HAST-provided devices appear like disk devices in the /dev/hast/ directory in FreeBSD, and can be used like standard block devices.  HAST is similar to a RAID1 (mirror) where each RAID component is provided across the network by one cluster node.

See also
 Network block device
 DRBD (Distributed Replicated Block Device)

References

External links
 HAST page at FreeBSD wiki
 HAST at FreeBSD HandBook

FreeBSD
Communications protocols